The Salisbury Mansion and Store is an historic house museum at 40 Highland Street in Worcester, Massachusetts.

History
The house was originally built on Lincoln Square in 1772 by Stephen Salisbury I with an attached storehouse from which he sold imported goods under the name S. & S. Salisbury. He and his brother Samuel had originally been in business together selling hardware goods in Boston, and Stephen moved to Worcester to expand the operation. In 1820 the store was closed down, and the space was converted for residential use by the family, which occupied it until 1851.  Thereafter it served as a girls' school, tenant house, and then a gentleman's social club until 1929, when the building was threatened with demolition by the then occupants,  the Worcester Lincoln Square Boys Club, who wanted to build more modern premises. It was saved by local efforts and moved to its current location on the former Salisbury estate near the museum and next to Salisbury House. It was donated to the American Antiquarian Society, which promptly gave it to the Worcester Art Museum, both of which were founded by Stephen Salisbury III. The museum undertook to restore the much-altered building to its condition as of 1830, and opened it for group tours as a historic house museum.

The building was listed on the National Register of Historic Places in 1975.

See also
National Register of Historic Places listings in northwestern Worcester, Massachusetts
National Register of Historic Places listings in Worcester County, Massachusetts

References

External links

Salisbury Mansion - Worcester Historical Museum
 Stephen Salisbury I on WAM website

Houses on the National Register of Historic Places in Worcester County, Massachusetts
Houses completed in 1772
Historic house museums in Massachusetts
Museums in Worcester, Massachusetts
Houses in Worcester, Massachusetts
National Register of Historic Places in Worcester, Massachusetts
Commercial buildings on the National Register of Historic Places in Massachusetts
National Register of Historic Places in Worcester County, Massachusetts